Huchudagaru (Mad Boys) is a 2014 Indian Kannada-language comedy drama film directed by debutant RJ Pradeepa, a Radio jockey with Radio City.

Plot
The film revolves around the typical life of four boys in villages of Karnataka.

Cast
 Chetan Chandra as Shiva
 Amith Vishwanath Madesh
 Deva as Shankara
 Prathap Raj as Nanjunda
 Adithi Rao as Paaru
 P. Ravi Shankar as Maari Gowda
 Avinash
 H. G. Dattatreya
 Vaijanath Biradar
 Tabla Nani
 Pavan U2

Soundtrack 

The album of Huchudugaru was released in October 2013. The music was composed by Joshua Sridhar

Track list

On the soundtracks of Huchudugaru, Kavya Christopher of The Times of India wrote, "[like the film]...the music album too is 'boys only'."

References

External links
 

2014 films
2014 comedy-drama films
Indian comedy-drama films
2010s Kannada-language films
2014 directorial debut films
Films scored by Joshua Sridhar